Richard Seymour is a former American football defensive tackle.

Richard Seymour may also refer to:

 Richard Seymour (cricketer), South African cricketer
 Richard Seymour (photographer), British photographer
 Richard Seymour (18th-century writer), editor of The Compleat Gamester (1722)
 Richard Seymour (21st-century writer) (born 1977), Marxist writer and broadcaster